France competed at the 2020 Summer Olympics in Tokyo. Originally scheduled to take place from 24 July to 9 August 2020, the Games were postponed to 23 July to 8 August 2021, because of the COVID-19 pandemic. French athletes have appeared in every Summer Olympic Games of the modern era, alongside Australia, Great Britain, Greece, and Switzerland. As Paris will host the 2024 Summer Olympics, France was the penultimate nation to enter the stadium, alongside the United States which will host the 2028 Summer Olympics in Los Angeles,  before the host country Japan during the parade of nations at the opening ceremony. Additionally, a French segment was performed in Paris and some pre-recorded events at the closing ceremony as performers did not travel to Tokyo due to the travel restrictions related to the pandemic. However, Paris mayor Anne Hidalgo was the only delegation present at the ceremony.

France competed in all sports except baseball (softball), field hockey, and water polo.

France repeated its gold medal tally from the previous games, but its overall medal haul was down from 42 to 33, the lowest since Athens 2004. The country however scored numerous victories in team sports, namely a double in handball (both men and women won gold), gold in men's volleyball, silver in men's basketball and women's rugby sevens, and bronze in women's basketball.

Medalists

|  style="text-align:left; width:78%; vertical-align:top;"|

|  style="text-align:left; width:22%; vertical-align:top;"|

Competitors

Archery

France fielded two archers (one man and one woman) to compete in the men's and women's individual recurve, respectively, at the Games by finishing among the top four vying for qualification at the 2021 European Championships in Antalya, Turkey.

Men

Women

Mixed

Artistic swimming

France fielded a squad of two artistic swimmers to compete in the women's duet event, by winning the silver medal at the 2021 FINA Olympic Qualification Tournament in Barcelona, Spain.

Athletics

French athletes further achieved the entry standards, either by qualifying time or by world ranking, in the following track and field events (up to a maximum of three athletes in each event):

On 19 March 2020, four marathon runners (Amdouni, Chahdi, Navarro, and Kipsang), along with race walkers Kévin Campion and three-time Olympian Yohann Diniz, became the first French track and field athletes to be officially selected to the Tokyo 2020 roster.

On 2 July 2021, 65 athletes, 44 men and 21 women, are announced to be part of the team.

Track & road events
Men

Women

Field events
Men

Women

Combined events – Men's decathlon

Badminton

France entered four badminton players for each of the following events into the Olympic tournament based on the BWF World Race to Tokyo Rankings: one entry each in the men's and women's singles and in the mixed doubles. The team was officially announced by the FFBaD on 23 June 2021.

Basketball

Indoor
Summary

Men's tournament

France men's basketball team qualified for the Games by reaching the semifinal stage and securing an outright berth as one of two highest-ranked squads from Europe at the 2019 FIBA Basketball World Cup in China.

Team roster

Group play

Quarterfinal

Semifinal

Gold medal game

Women's tournament

France women's basketball team qualified for the Olympics as one of three highest-ranked eligible squads at the Bourges meet of the 2020 FIBA Women's Olympic Qualifying Tournament.

Team roster

Group play

Quarterfinal

Semifinal

Bronze medal match

3×3 basketball
Summary

Women's tournament

France women's national 3x3 team qualified for the Olympics by securing a top three finish at the 2021 Olympic Qualifying Tournament.

Team roster
The players were announced on 2 July 2021.

Ana Cata-Chitiga
Laëtitia Guapo
Marie-Ève Paget
Mamignan Touré

Group play

Quarterfinal

Semifinal

Bronze medal match

Boxing

France entered six boxers (five men and one woman) into the Olympic tournament. 2019 world bronze medalist Billal Bennama (men's flyweight), Samuel Kistohurry (men's featherweight), Rio 2016 silver medalist Sofiane Oumiha (men's lightweight), Mourad Aliev (men's super heavyweight), and Maïva Hamadouche (women's lightweight) secured the spots on the French squad in their respective weight divisions, either by winning the round of 16 match, advancing to the semifinal match, or scoring a box-off triumph, at the 2020 European Qualification Tournament in London and Paris.

Canoeing

Slalom
French canoeists qualified one boat for each of the following classes through the 2019 ICF Canoe Slalom World Championships in La Seu d'Urgell, Spain. The slalom canoeists, including Rio 2016 Olympian Marie-Zélia Lafont in the women's K-1, were officially named to the French roster on 15 October 2020.

Sprint
French canoeists qualified five boats in each of the following distances for the Games through the 2019 ICF Canoe Sprint World Championships in Szeged, Hungary. Meanwhile, one additional boat was awarded to the French canoeist in the men's K-1 1000 m by winning the bronze medal at the 2021 European Canoe Sprint Qualification Regatta. The sprint canoeists, including Rio 2016 silver medalist Maxime Beaumont in the men's K-1 200 m, were officially named to the French roster on 8 June 2021.

Men

Women

Qualification Legend: FA = Qualify to final A (medal); FB = Qualify to final B (non-medal)

Cycling

Road
France entered a squad of six riders (five men and one woman) to compete in their respective Olympic road races, by virtue of their top 50 national finish (for men) and top 22 (for women) in the UCI World Ranking. Juliette Labous was named as part of the ninth batch of nominated French athletes to the Tokyo 2020 roster on 11 May 2021.

Track
Following the completion of the 2020 UCI Track Cycling World Championships, French riders accumulated spots in the men's team sprint, women's team pursuit, men's and women's omnium and men's and women's madison. As a result of their place in the men's team sprint, France won its right to enter two riders in the men's sprint and keirin. Unable to earn a quota place in the women's team sprint, France entered at least one rider to compete in the women's sprint and keirin based on her final individual UCI Olympic rankings.

The sprint riders were officially named as part of the tenth batch of nominated French athletes to the Tokyo 2020 roster on 26 May 2021.

Sprint

Team sprint

Pursuit

Keirin

Omnium

Madison

Mountain biking
French mountain bikers qualified for two men's and two women's quota places into the Olympic cross-country race, as a result of the nation's third-place finish for men and fifth for women, respectively, in the UCI Olympic Ranking List of 16 May 2021. The mountain biking team was named as part of the nation's tenth batch of nominated athletes on 26 May 2021, with Pauline Ferrand-Prévot leading the bikers to her third consecutive Games.

BMX
France received a total of seven quota spots (four men's and three women's) for BMX at the Olympics, as a result of the nation's top-place finish for men's race, third for women's race, and fifth for men's freestyle in the UCI Olympic Ranking List of 1 June 2021; and the nation's top-two placement at the 2019 UCI Urban Cycling World Championships in Chengdu, China.

The BMX squad was named as part of the nation's eleventh batch of nominated athletes on 8 June 2021, with Joris Daudet leading the riders to his third consecutive Games.

Race

Freestyle

Diving

French divers qualified for three individual spots at the Games by finishing in the top twelve of their respective events at the 2021 FINA Diving World Cup.

Equestrian

French equestrians qualified a full squad each in the team eventing and jumping competition, respectively, by virtue of a top-six finish at the 2018 FEI World Equestrian Games in Tryon, North Carolina, United States and a top-three finish at the 2019 FEI European Championships in Rotterdam, Netherlands. Meanwhile, a composite squad of three dressage riders was formed and thereby added to the French roster by receiving a spare berth freed up by one of two nations (South Africa and Brazil), unable to fulfill the NOC Certificate of Capability, based on their individual results in the FEI Olympic rankings at the end of 2019 season.

The French equestrian squads were named on 2 July 2021.

Dressage
Isabelle Pinto and Hot Chocolat VD Kwaplas have been named the travelling alternates.

Qualification Legend: Q = Qualified for the final; q = Qualified for the final as a lucky loser

Eventing
Karim Laghouag and Triton Fontaine were named as the travelling alternates and replaced Thomas Carlile and Birmane who withdrew.

Jumping

Fencing

French fencers qualified a full squad each in the men's and women's team foil, men's team épée, and women's team sabre at the Games, by finishing among the top four nations in the FIE Olympic Team Rankings. London 2012 Olympian Boladé Apithy (men's sabre) and rookie Coraline Vitalis (women's épée) secured additional places on the French team as one of the two highest-ranked fencers vying for individual qualification from Europe in the FIE Adjusted Official Rankings.

Daniel Jérent initially qualified to fence in the individual and team epee events, but was banned from participating due to a positive urine test for a banned product. Jérent was replaced by Romain Cannone, who went on to win the gold medal in individual epee. Ronan Gustin was  recalled to be a team replacement.

Men

Women

Football

Summary

Men's tournament

France men's football team qualified for the Games by advancing to the semifinal stage of the 2019 UEFA European Under-21 Championship in Italy, signifying the country's recurrence to the Olympic tournament after twenty-four years.

Team roster

Group play

Golf

France entered two male and two female golfers into the Olympic tournament. Victor Perez qualified but chose not to play.

Gymnastics

Artistic
France fielded a full squad of seven artistic gymnasts (three men and four women) into the Olympic competition, failing to send the men's all-around team for the first time since 1992. The women's squad topped the list of nine nations eligible for qualification in the team all-around to assure its Olympic berth at the 2019 World Artistic Gymnastics Championships in Stuttgart, Germany. On the men's side, two-time Olympian Cyril Tommasone, his Rio 2016 teammate Samir Aït Saïd, and rookie Loris Frasca booked their spots in the individual all-around and apparatus events at the same tournament, with Tommasone finishing sixth in the pommel horse final and Aït Saïd capturing the bronze in the rings.

Men

Women
Team

Individual finals

Trampoline
France qualified one gymnast each for the men's and women's trampoline by finishing in the top eight, respectively, at the 2019 World Championships in Tokyo, Japan. The athletes were announced on 16 June 2021.

Handball

Summary

Men's tournament

France men's national handball team qualified for the Olympics by securing a top-two finish at the Montpellier leg of the 2020 IHF Olympic Qualification Tournament.

Team roster

Group play

Quarterfinal

Semifinal

Gold medal game

Women's tournament

French women's handball team qualified for the Olympics by winning the gold medal and securing an outright berth at the final match of the 2018 European Championships in Paris.

Team roster
 Women's team event – one team of 15 players

Group play

Quarterfinal

Semifinal

Gold medal game

Judo

Men

Women

Mixed

Karate
 
France entered two karateka into the inaugural Olympic tournament. 2018 world champion Steven Da Costa qualified directly for the men's kumite 67-kg category by finishing among the top four karateka at the end of the combined WKF Olympic Rankings. Alexandra Feracci finished second in the final pool round to secure a spot in the women's kata at the World Olympic Qualification Tournament in Paris.

Kumite

Kata

Modern pentathlon

French athletes qualified for the following spots in the modern pentathlon at the Games. Rio 2016 Olympian Valentin Prades and rookie Marie Oteiza confirmed places in their respective events with a top-ten finish (second for Prades and sixth for Oteiza among those eligible for Olympic qualification) at the 2019 European Championships in Bath, England. Less than a month later, Valentin Belaud was added to the French roster with a gold-medal victory at the 2019 UIPM World Championships in Budapest, Hungary.

Rowing

France qualified five boats for each of the following rowing classes into the Olympic regatta, with the majority of crews confirming Olympic places for their boats at the 2019 FISA World Championships in Ottensheim, Austria. Meanwhile, the women's quadruple sculls boat was awarded to the French roster with a top-two finish at the 2021 FISA Final Qualification Regatta in Lucerne, Switzerland.

On 8 June 2021, twelve rowers (eight men and four women) were officially selected to the French roster for the Games, including two-time Olympian Matthieu Androdias and his Rio 2016 partner Hugo Boucheron in the men's coxless pair.

Men

Women

Qualification Legend: FA=Final A (medal); FB=Final B (non-medal); FC=Final C (non-medal); FD=Final D (non-medal); FE=Final E (non-medal); FF=Final F (non-medal); SA/B=Semifinals A/B; SC/D=Semifinals C/D; SE/F=Semifinals E/F; QF=Quarterfinals; R=Repechage

Rugby sevens

Women's tournament

France's women's national rugby sevens team qualified by securing a spot in the final repechage tournament on 20 June 2021.

Team roster

Group play

Quarterfinal

Semifinal

Final

Sailing

French sailors qualified one boat in each of the following classes through the 2018 Sailing World Championships, the class-associated Worlds, and the continental regattas. Additionally, they received an unused berth from Oceania to send the women's 49erFX crew to the Games based on the results at the 2019 World Championships.

At the end of the 2019 season, the French Sailing Federation selected the first five sailors to compete at the Enoshima regatta, including the reigning Olympic windsurfing champion Charline Picon (women's RS:X) and Rio 2016 bronze medalist Camille Lecointre (women's 470). The 49er and Nacra 17 crews were named to the Olympic team on 7 January 2020, with New Caledonia native Thomas Goyard scoring a third-place finish at the Worlds two months later to lock the men's RS:X spot on the roster. Laser Radial sailor Marie Bolou, with Jean-Baptiste Bernaz making his fourth Olympic trip in the Laser class, joined Goyard as part of the fifth batch of nominated French athletes on 19 March 2020. The women's 49erFX crew (Dubois and Sebesi) completed the country's sailing lineup for the Games on 27 April 2021.

Men

Women

Mixed

M = Medal race; EL = Eliminated – did not advance into the medal race

Shooting

French shooters achieved quota places for the following events by virtue of their best finishes at the 2018 ISSF World Championships, the 2019 ISSF World Cup series, European Championships or Games, and European Qualifying Tournament, as long as they obtain a minimum qualifying score (MQS) by 31 May 2020.

On 19 March 2020, the French National Olympic and Sports Committee announced the first six shooters to compete at the Games, including Rio 2016 silver and 2018 world bronze medalist Jean Quiquampoix in the men's rapid fire pistol. Pistol shooter and London 2012 bronze medalist Celine Goberville, along with shotgun rookies Emmanuel Petit (men's skeet) and Mélanie Couzy (women's trap), joined as part of the sixth batch of nominated French athletes for Tokyo 2020 three months later.

Men

Women

Skateboarding

France entered five skateboarders to compete across all events at the Games based on the World Skate Olympic Rankings of 30 June 2021: one entry each in the men's and women's park with the rest in the street (two men's and one women's).
Madeleine Larcheron will be the youngest athlete in the French delegation at the Tokyo Olympic Games (15 years old)

Sport climbing

France entered four sport climbers into the Olympic tournament. Mickaël Mawem qualified directly for the men's combined event, by advancing to the final and securing one of the seven provisional berths at the 2019 IFSC World Championships in Hachioji, Japan. Meanwhile, Mickäel's brother Bassa Mawem and Julia Chanourdie joined the French roster, by finishing in the top six of those eligible for qualification at the IFSC World Olympic Qualifying Event in Toulouse. The fourth and final slot was awarded to Anouck Jaubert, after accepting an unused berth, as the highest-ranked sport climber vying for qualification on the women's side, at the Worlds.

Surfing

France sent four surfers (two per gender) to compete in their respective shortboard races at the Games. Michel Bourez, Jérémy Florès, and Johanne Defay finished within the top ten (for men) and top eight (for women), respectively, of those eligible for qualification in the World Surf League rankings to secure their spots on the French roster for Tokyo 2020. Meanwhile, Pauline Ado completed the nation's surfing lineup by scoring a top-two finish within her heat at the 2021 ISA World Surfing Games in El Salvador.

Swimming 

French swimmers further achieved qualifying standards in the following events (up to a maximum of two swimmers in each event at the Olympic Qualifying Time (OQT), and potentially one at the Olympic Selection Time (OST)): Swimmers must attain the federation's entry standards in one of two prerequisite Olympic qualification stages to assure their selection to the French roster: the 2020 French Winter Championships (10–13 December) in Saint-Raphael and the 2021 French Elite Championships & Olympic Trials (15–20 June) in Chartres.

Men

Women

 Swimmers who participated in the heats only.

Table tennis

France entered six athletes into the table tennis competition at the Games. The men's team secured a berth by advancing to the quarterfinal round of the 2020 World Olympic Qualification Event in Gondomar, Portugal, permitting a maximum of two starters to compete in the men's singles tournament. Moreover, an additional berth was awarded to the French table tennis players competing in the inaugural mixed doubles based on the ITTF World Rankings of 1 May 2021. 16-year-old teen Prithika Pavade and Chinese-born Yuan Jia Nan scored a second-match final triumph each to book two of the four available places in the women's singles at the 2021 European Qualification Tournament in Odivelas, Portugal. On 9 June 2021, ITTF granted a spare berth forfeited by North Korea to the French women's table tennis team, as the next highest-ranked eligible nation in the federation's World Rankings.

The men's table tennis team was officially named as part of the nation's tenth batch of nominated athletes for the Games on 26 May 2021, including Rio 2016 Olympians Emmanuel Lebesson and Simon Gauzy.

Men

Women

Mixed

Taekwondo

France entered two athletes into the taekwondo competition at the Games. 2019 world bronze medalist Magda Wiet-Hénin (women's 67 kg) and Althéa Laurin (women's +67 kg) secured the spots on the French taekwondo squad with a top two finish each in their respective weight classes at the 2021 European Qualification Tournament in Sofia, Bulgaria.

Tennis

At the conclusion of the qualification period for the Olympic tennis tournament, the following French players had qualified for the competition by means of rankings.

Men

Women

Mixed

Triathlon

French qualified five triathletes for the following events at the Games by finishing among the top seven nations in the ITU Mixed Relay Olympic Rankings.

Individual

Relay

Volleyball

Indoor
Summary

Men's tournament

France men's volleyball team qualified for the Olympics by winning the final match and securing an outright berth at the European Olympic Qualification Tournament in Berlin, Germany.

Team roster

Group play

Quarterfinal

Semifinal

Gold medal game

Weightlifting

France qualified four weightlifters (one man and three women) for each of the following classes into the Olympic competition. Two-time Olympian Bernardin Kingue Matam (men's 67 kg) and Dora Tchakounté (women's 59 kg) secured one of the top eight slots each in their respective weight divisions based on the IWF Absolute World Ranking, with Anaïs Michel (women's 49 kg) and Gaëlle Nayo-Ketchanke (women's 87 kg) topping the list of weightlifters from Europe in the IWF Absolute Continental Ranking.

Wrestling

France qualified two wrestlers for each of the following classes into the Olympic competition. One of them granted an Olympic license by advancing to the top two finals of the women's freestyle 68 kg at the 2021 European Qualification Tournament in Budapest, Hungary, while another French wrestler claimed one of the remaining slots in the women's freestyle 57 kg at the 2021 World Qualification Tournament in Sofia, Bulgaria.

Freestyle

See also

 France at the 2020 Summer Paralympics

References

Nations at the 2020 Summer Olympics
2020
2021 in French sport